Lomná is a large village and municipality in Námestovo District in the Žilina Region of northern Slovakia.

History
In historical records the village was first mentioned in 1609.

Geography
The municipality lies at an altitude of 690 metres and covers an area of 21.559 km2. It has a population of about 775 people.

External links
https://web.archive.org/web/20070427022352/http://www.statistics.sk/mosmis/eng/run.html

Villages and municipalities in Námestovo District